Copelatus neelumae is a species of diving beetle. It is part of the genus Copelatus in the subfamily Copelatinae of the family Dytiscidae. It was described by Vazirani in 1973.

References

neelumae
Beetles described in 1973